Linas Pilibaitis (born 5 April 1985 in Kretinga) is a Lithuanian professional footballer.

Career 
Pilibaitis joined Kaunas aged 17 in 2002, gradually working his way into the first team as he developed in the following years. This process was aided by a loan spell at Klaipėda side FK Atlantas in 2004, where he scored his first senior goal. Having played a prominent role in Kaunas's 2006 A Lyga victory, he was loaned to Hearts in January 2007. He made his debut for the Jambos in a 2–0 victory at Motherwell on 5 March 2007 but returned to Kaunas in August of that year, having made only five appearances for the Hearts first team.

Pilibaitis scored the winning goal for Kaunas which knocked out Rangers of the second qualifying tie of the UEFA Champions League on 6 August 2008. He joined than in January 2009 to Győri ETO FC.

In July 2012 he started a trial with Israeli powerhouse Maccabi Haifa.

On 26 February 2017, it was announced that Pilibaitis will return to the Lithuanian A Lyga contenders Atlantas.

Career statistics

International
Usually played as an attacking midfielder or support striker, Pilibaitis earned his first international cap for Lithuania in 2006.

Honours
Kaunas
Lithuanian Championship: 2002, 2004, 2006
Lithuanian Cup: 2002, 2004, 2005
Győr
Nemzeti Bajnokság I: 2012–13
FK Žalgiris
Lithuanian Championship: 2014, 2015, 2016
Lithuanian Cup: 2013–14, 2014–15, 2015–16, 2016
Lithuanian Supercup: 2016

References

External links

Appearances at londonhearts.com

1985 births
Living people
Sportspeople from Kretinga
Lithuanian footballers
Association football midfielders
Lithuania international footballers
Lithuanian expatriate footballers
A Lyga players
FBK Kaunas footballers
FK Atlantas players
FK Žalgiris players
Scottish Premier League players
Heart of Midlothian F.C. players
Nemzeti Bajnokság I players
Győri ETO FC players
Mezőkövesdi SE footballers
Liga I players
Sepsi OSK Sfântu Gheorghe players
Expatriate footballers in Hungary
Lithuanian expatriate sportspeople in Hungary
Expatriate footballers in Romania
Lithuanian expatriate sportspeople in Romania
Expatriate footballers in Scotland
Lithuanian expatriate sportspeople in Scotland
People from Kretinga